The 1958–59 Landsdelsserien was a Norwegian second-tier football league season.

The league was contested by 54 teams, divided into a total of seven groups from four districts; Østland/Søndre, Østland/Nordre, Sørland/Vestre and Møre/Trøndelag. The two group winners in the Østland districts, Rapid and Vålerengen promoted directly to the 1959–60 Hovedserien. The other five group winners qualified for promotion play-offs to compete for two spots in the following season's top flight. Start and Brage won the play-offs and were promoted.

Tables

District Østland/Søndre

District Østland/Nordre

District Sørland/Vestland

Group A

Group B

Group C

District Møre/Trøndelag

Møre

Trøndelag

Promotion play-offs
Sørland/Vestland 
Results
Bryne 0–2 Start
Start 2–0 Os
Os 4–0 Bryne

Møre/Trøndelag
Hødd 2–3 Brage
Brage 5–3 Hødd

Brage won 8–5 on aggregate and were promoted to Hovedserien.

References

Norwegian First Division seasons
1958 in Norwegian football
1959 in Norwegian football
Norway